Behind Show Windows is a 1955 Soviet comedy film directed by Samson Samsonov.

Plot 
The head of the finished dress section, Mikhail Krylov, did not get along with the director of the garment factory, Anna Andreevna. He does not like tailoring products. But the situation changes drastically when some crooks try to harm Mikhail and Anna in turn decides to help him.

Starring 
 Oleg Anofriev as Slava Sidorkin (as Oleg Anufriyev)
 Viktor Arkasov
 Olga Bgan
 Ivan Dmitriev as Mikhail Ivanovich Krylov
 Mikaela Drozdovskaya as Yulya Petrova
 Svetlana Druzhinina as Sonya Bozhko
 Vyacheslav Gostinsky as
 Anatoliy Kuznetsov as Lieutenant
 Nadezhda Medvedeva as Anna Andreevna
 Valentina Leonteva as Diktor TV (uncredited)

References

External links 
 

1955 films
1950s Russian-language films
Soviet comedy films
1955 comedy films